Glinze is a river of Brandenburg, Germany. It is a tributary of the Dosse, which it joins in Wittstock.

See also
List of rivers of Brandenburg

Rivers of Brandenburg
Rivers of Germany